The Gelmke is a small stream, roughly  long, and right-hand tributary of the Abzucht in Lower Saxony, Germany. The stream flows through part of the town of Goslar.

Geography 
Its source lies east-northeast of the hill known as the Dicker Kopf (668 m) and north of the Eichenberg (670 m). It flows initially northwards through a densely wooded valley, where it is crossed by the E 11 European long-distance trail before emerging into open fields and swinging east, just above the old Goslar sewage ponds. It then heads north again to join the Abzucht near Goslar station.

See also 
List of rivers of Lower Saxony

References 

Rivers of Lower Saxony
Rivers of the Harz
Rivers of Germany